The Hemingway-Pfeiffer House, also known as the Pfeiffer House and Carriage House, is a historic house museum at 10th and Cherry Streets in Piggott, Arkansas. It is where novelist Ernest Hemingway wrote portions of his 1929 novel A Farewell to Arms. Hemingway was married to Pauline Pfeiffer, the daughter of the owners of the house, Paul and Mary Pfeiffer.

Overview
Pauline Pfeiffer, Hemingway's second wife, had grown up in the home. Her uncle Gustavus Pfeiffer was a benefactor of the couple, even financing an African safari trip that inspired Hemingway's The Green Hills of Africa.

Hemingway did his writing in a barn behind the home which he converted into a writing studio. The space is decorated with items that would have been found in the studio when Hemingway used it.

Modern use
The house is now the home of Arkansas State University's Hemingway-Pfeiffer Museum and Educational Center. The mission statement of the center is to "contribute to the regional, national and global understanding of the 1920s and 1930s eras by focusing on the internationally connected Pfeiffer family, of Piggott, Arkansas, and their son-in-law Ernest Hemingway." The center is also the visitor's center for the Crowley's Ridge Parkway.

The property also includes the Matilda and Karl Pfeiffer Education Center, a Tudor-style home where Pauline's brother and his wife lived before it was opened to the public in 2004.

See also
Ernest Hemingway House (Key West, Florida)
National Register of Historic Places listings in Clay County, Arkansas

References

External links
 Literary Traveler.com: "Ernest Hemingway and Piggott, Arkansas"
  Official Hemingway-Pfeiffer Museum and Educational Center web site

Houses in Clay County, Arkansas
Crowley's Ridge Parkway
Historic house museums in Arkansas
Museums in Clay County, Arkansas
Biographical museums in Arkansas
Ernest Hemingway
Literary museums in the United States
Arkansas State University
University museums in Arkansas
Houses completed in 1927
Carriage houses in the United States
Carriage houses on the National Register of Historic Places
Houses on the National Register of Historic Places in Arkansas
National Register of Historic Places in Clay County, Arkansas
Transportation buildings and structures on the National Register of Historic Places in Arkansas
Colonial Revival architecture in Arkansas